Slightly Scarlet is a 1956 American crime film, with some  noirish elements,  based on James M. Cain's novel Love's Lovely Counterfeit. It was directed by Allan Dwan, and its widescreen cinematography was by John Alton.

The picture tells the story of Ben Grace (John Payne), a crooked cop working for a powerful metropolitan crime boss—Solly Caspar (Ted de Corsia), who uses entrapment, extortion, and blackmail to push Caspar aside and elect a “reform” mayor he exploits. Two sisters Rhonda Fleming, a self-interested “good girl” at the center of a love triangle, and Arlene Dahl, a “bad girl” ex-con and walking plot complication, add interest to a vibrant technicolor production.

Plot
The ruthless and uncouth Solly Caspar, Bay City's crime boss, is seeking to fend off an annoying “reform” campaign by multi - millionaire mayoral hopeful, Frank Jansen (Kent Taylor).  Caspar tasks a bright “college boy” in his ring he thoroughly resents, crooked cop Ben Grace, to dig up some dirt on Jansen and torpedo his threatening race.

Ben follows the candidate's brilliant scarlet-tressed and wildly curvaceous secretary/girlfriend, June Lyons (Rhonda Fleming), to a women’s prison to photograph her picking   up her equally redheaded, sporty,  and sex-starved kleptomaniac sister Dorothy (Arlene Dahl), a multiple ex-con.  Ben immediately becomes attracted to June, and withholds his incriminating evidence from Caspar.

Flipping sides, Ben instead gives June a tape he made proving Caspar killed a crusading newspaperman supporting the honest Jansen. Caspar, who had slapped Ben around and humiliated him in front of the rest of his gang for appearing to fail to gather any dirt on Jansen, is forced to flee to nearby Mexico. Ben then seduces June, steals her from Jansen, and, unbeknownst to her or the new mayor, takes over Caspar’s rackets.

Rather than the smooth sailing he had planned, Ben faces blowback from Caspar’s gang and stiffened resistance from city hall and the police.

Meanwhile, June’s nymphomaniac sister, who had been attracted to Ben from the start, continues her play for him. She accompanies him to a beach house he has claimed along with the rest of the spoils from Caspar’s empire, where Ben is headed to rifle its safe for $160,000 to leave town with.   She determinedly tries to seduce a disinterested Ben, and becomes huffy when rejected, scaring him by firing a spear gun at his head. After searching the house, he is forced to leave without finding the money.

To get even for Ben’s rejections, she later plays up their trip to June into an escapade. June confronts Ben, who responds that it is she he really wants. Given the suspicions surrounding the seeming tryst, June wonders if it's really both of them he's after.

Dorothy is subsequently arrested for stealing a pearl necklace, and June pleads with Ben to intervene on her behalf. He leans on his ex-boss, a former lieutenant whom Ben had managed to reward with an undeserved promotion to chief of police, to release Dorothy and purge her record.

Jansen, who still loves June, discovers the duplicity and insists that her sister must go back to jail.

Caspar returns from Mexico seeking revenge on Ben. Appearing at the beach house, he finds a drunken and provocative Dorothy alone there. An alcoholic and a nymphomaniac, she throws herself at the despicable Caspar. When Caspar boastfully scatters the stacks of money from the safe on the floor and offers some to Dorothy, she tries to steal some more. Still, Caspar invites her to flee back to Mexico with him, and she accepts.  June shows up to rescue her, only to end up at the point of Caspar’s gun. Facing death, she shoots him first with the spear gun, then twice with his own revolver.

Ben arrives, and, with the heat on him from Caspar’s gang, plus the police sure to be on his heels, entreats June to go away with him and the money but she refuses. Caspar, wounded but not yet dead, shoots Ben and wounds him. Caspar’s gang arrives. Ben, June, and an increasingly deranged Dorothy end up trapped in a bedroom. Ben calls the police and tells them to rush a full squad to the beach house to round up Caspar and his hoods.

Caspar tells Ben that if he comes out he will spare the two women. Ben comes out and taunts Caspar who shoots him several times.  
The police finally arrive and round up Caspar and his gang. Badly wounded, Ben is put on a stretcher. June speaks to him tenderly before he is placed in an ambulance. June then proclaims that Dorothy will get all the care she needs, care that Dorothy has rejected until now.

The movie ends ambiguously, leaving it unclear whether Ben will survive, will June continue to care about him if he does, or will she return to the still loving but honest and dull Jansen.

Cast
 John Payne as Ben Grace
 Rhonda Fleming as June Lyons
 Arlene Dahl as Dorothy Lyons
 Kent Taylor as Frank Jansen
 Ted de Corsia as Solly Caspar
 Lance Fuller as Gauss
 Buddy Baer as Lenhardt
 Ellen Corby as June Lyons' Maid (uncredited)
 Frank Gerstle as Detective Lt. Dave Dietz (uncredited)
 Myron Healey as Wilson - Caspar Thug (uncredited)

Background
The film was made when prolific director Allan Dwan was seventy years old.  Dwan directed 386 films in his long career and his first work was the silent short Strategy, produced in 1911.

Cinematography
According to critic Blake Lucas the film was made with a modest budget, and yet the film is richly colored and well decorated and is one of the best of the Dwan-Alton pictures. Lucas wrote, "Alton's imagination in lighting is as distinctive in color as it is in black and white." Alton uses extensive shadows and large black areas, and he accentuates an array of pinks, greens, and especially the color orange. The end result is a startling effect in many of the scenes, all in Technicolor.

Critical reception
Bosley Crowther, film critic for The New York Times, was caustic about the casting and the adaptation of Cain's novel, and wrote: "Rhonda Fleming and a laughably kittenish Arlene Dahl, are a couple of on-the-make sisters, and the fellow, played by John Payne, is an on-the-make big-time gangster. In the end all their faces are red. So, we say, should be the faces of the people responsible for this film, which is said to have been taken from a novel (unrecognizable) of James M. Cain. For it is an exhausting lot of twaddle about crime and city politics, an honest mayor, his secretary-mistress, her kleptomaniacal sister and the fellow who wants to get control of the gang.

Critic and filmmaker Jean-Luc Godard was kinder to the film, placing it fifth in his list of the best films of 1956 in Cahiers du Cinéma.

See also
 List of American films of 1956

References

External links

 
 
 
 

1956 films
1956 crime films
Color film noir
Films based on American novels
Films based on works by James M. Cain
Films directed by Allan Dwan
American mystery films
1950s English-language films
1950s American films
American crime films